Elections to Runnymede Council were held on 2 May 2002. One third of the council was up for election and the Conservative Party stayed in overall control of the council.

After the election, the composition of the council was:
Conservative: 32
Runnymede Independent Residents Group: 6
Labour: 4

Election result

Ward results

References
2002 Runnymede election result
Ward results

2002
2002 English local elections
2000s in Surrey